Féilim mac Fiach Ó Broin (died 1630) was the son of Fiach mac Aodh Ó Broin and Rose O'Toole. He was a Gaelic chieftain who in 1600 submitted to Elizabeth I of England therefore ending the long lasting reign of the O'Byrne clan over County Wicklow. O'Byrne held the office of Member of Parliament (M.P.) for County Wicklow in 1613. O'Byrne married Winifred O'Toole and together they had eight sons and one daughter and was succeeded by his eldest son Brian McFelim O'Byrne.

Felim O'Byrne died in 1630 at Ballinacor Co. Wicklow.

Members of the Parliament of Ireland (pre-1801) for County Wicklow constituencies
Irish lords
Year of birth missing
1630 deaths
Irish chiefs of the name